Signal processing is an electrical engineering subfield that focuses on analyzing, modifying and synthesizing signals, such as sound, images, potential fields, seismic signals, altimetry processing, and scientific measurements. Signal processing techniques are used to optimize transmissions, digital storage efficiency, correcting distorted signals, subjective video quality and to also detect or pinpoint components of interest in a measured signal.

History
According to Alan V. Oppenheim and Ronald W. Schafer, the principles of signal processing can be found in the classical numerical analysis techniques of the 17th century.  They further state that the digital refinement of these techniques can be found in the digital control systems of the 1940s and 1950s.

In 1948, Claude Shannon wrote the influential paper "A Mathematical Theory of Communication" which was published in the Bell System Technical Journal.  The paper laid the groundwork for later development of information communication systems and the processing of signals for transmission.

Signal processing matured and flourished in the 1960s and 1970s, and digital signal processing became widely used with specialized digital signal processor chips in the 1980s.

Categories

Analog

Analog signal processing is for signals that have not been digitized, as in most 20th-century radio, telephone, and television systems. This involves linear electronic circuits as well as nonlinear ones. The former are, for instance, passive filters, active filters, additive mixers, integrators, and delay lines. Nonlinear circuits include compandors, multipliers (frequency mixers, voltage-controlled amplifiers), voltage-controlled filters, voltage-controlled oscillators, and phase-locked loops.

Continuous time
Continuous-time signal processing is for signals that vary with the change of continuous domain (without considering some individual interrupted points).

The methods of signal processing include time domain, frequency domain, and complex frequency domain. This technology mainly discusses the modeling of a linear time-invariant continuous system, integral of the system's zero-state response, setting up system function and the continuous time filtering of deterministic signals

Discrete time
Discrete-time signal processing is for sampled signals, defined only at discrete points in time, and as such are quantized in time, but not in magnitude.

Analog discrete-time signal processing is a technology based on electronic devices such as sample and hold circuits, analog time-division multiplexers, analog delay lines and analog feedback shift registers. This technology was a predecessor of digital signal processing (see below), and is still used in advanced processing of gigahertz signals.

The concept of discrete-time signal processing also refers to a theoretical discipline that establishes a mathematical basis for digital signal processing, without taking quantization error into consideration.

Digital

Digital signal processing is the processing of digitized discrete-time sampled signals. Processing is done by general-purpose computers or by digital circuits such as ASICs, field-programmable gate arrays or specialized digital signal processors (DSP chips). Typical arithmetical operations include fixed-point and floating-point, real-valued and complex-valued, multiplication and addition. Other typical operations supported by the hardware are circular buffers and lookup tables. Examples of algorithms are the fast Fourier transform (FFT), finite impulse response (FIR) filter, Infinite impulse response (IIR) filter, and adaptive filters such as the Wiener and Kalman filters.

Nonlinear
Nonlinear signal processing involves the analysis and processing of signals produced from nonlinear systems and can be in the time, frequency, or spatio-temporal domains. Nonlinear systems can produce highly complex behaviors including bifurcations, chaos, harmonics, and subharmonics which cannot be produced or analyzed using linear methods. 

Polynomial signal processing is a type of non-linear signal processing, where polynomial systems may be interpreted as conceptually straight forward extensions of linear systems to the non-linear case.

Statistical
Statistical signal processing is an approach which treats signals as stochastic processes, utilizing their statistical properties to perform signal processing tasks. Statistical techniques are widely used in signal processing applications. For example, one can model the probability distribution of noise incurred when photographing an image, and construct techniques based on this model to reduce the noise in the resulting image.

Application fields

 Audio signal processing for electrical signals representing sound, such as speech or music
 Image processing in digital cameras, computers and various imaging systems
 Video processing for interpreting moving pictures
 Wireless communication waveform generations, demodulation, filtering, equalization
 Control systems  
 Array processing for processing signals from arrays of sensors
 Process control a variety of signals are used, including the industry standard 4-20 mA current loop
 Seismology
 Financial signal processing analyzing financial data using signal processing techniques, especially for prediction purposes.
 Feature extraction, such as image understanding and speech recognition.
 Quality improvement, such as noise reduction, image enhancement, and echo cancellation.
 Source coding including audio compression, image compression, and video compression.
 Genomic signal processing
 In geophysics, signal processing is used to amplify the signal vs the noise within time-series measurements of geophysical data. Processing is conducted within either the time domain or frequency domain, or both.

In communication systems, signal processing may occur at:
 OSI layer 1 in the seven-layer OSI model, the physical layer (modulation, equalization, multiplexing, etc.); 
 OSI layer 2, the data link layer (forward error correction);
 OSI layer 6, the presentation layer (source coding, including analog-to-digital conversion and data compression).

Typical devices 
 Filters for example analog (passive or active) or digital (FIR, IIR, frequency domain or stochastic filters, etc.)
 Samplers and analog-to-digital converters for signal acquisition and reconstruction, which involves measuring a physical signal, storing or transferring it as digital signal, and possibly later rebuilding the original signal or an approximation thereof. 
 Signal compressors 
 Digital signal processors (DSPs)

Mathematical methods applied
 Differential equations
 Recurrence relations
 Transform theory
 Time-frequency analysis for processing non-stationary signals
 Spectral estimation for determining the spectral content (i.e., the distribution of power over frequency) of a time series 
Statistical signal processing analyzing and extracting information from signals and noise based on their stochastic properties
Linear time-invariant system theory, and transform theory
Polynomial signal processing analysis of systems which relate input and output using polynomials
System identification and classification
Calculus
Complex analysis
Vector spaces and Linear algebra
Functional analysis
Probability and stochastic processes
Detection theory
Estimation theory
Optimization
Numerical methods
Time series
Data mining for statistical analysis of relations between large quantities of variables (in this context representing many physical signals), to extract previously unknown interesting patterns

See also
 Algebraic signal processing
 Audio filter
 Bounded variation
 Digital image processing
 Dynamic range compression, companding, limiting, and noise gating
 Fourier transform
 Information theory
 Least-squares spectral analysis
 Non-local means
 Reverberation
 Sensitivity (electronics)
 Time series

References

Further reading
 
 
 
 Kainam Thomas Wong : Statistical Signal Processing lecture notes at the University of Waterloo, Canada.
 Ali H. Sayed, Adaptive Filters, Wiley, NJ, 2008, .
 Thomas Kailath, Ali H. Sayed, and Babak Hassibi, Linear Estimation, Prentice-Hall, NJ, 2000, .

External links
 Signal Processing for Communications – free online textbook by Paolo Prandoni and Martin Vetterli (2008)
 Scientists and Engineers Guide to Digital Signal Processing – free online textbook by Stephen Smith

 
Mass media technology
Telecommunication theory